Michelle More (born June 12, 1981) is a professional American beach volleyball player. Michelle grew up in Southern California and attended the University of Nevada-Reno. At Nevada-Reno, More met fellow volleyball player Suzanne Stonebarger, who is her beach volleyball teammate. After a college volleyball career at Nevada-Reno in which she set several school records, More entered the Association of Volleyball Professionals. A native of Torrance, California, More resides in nearby Redondo Beach.

Team Gorgeous
Prior to joining the AVP, More and her teammate Suzanne Stonebarger were given the nickname "Team Gorgeous". In 2009, the pair appeared in a Playboy magazine spread.

References

External links
 Michelle's website
 Suzanne's website
 Suzanne's website

1981 births
Living people
American women's beach volleyball players
University of Nevada, Reno alumni
Sportspeople from Torrance, California
Sportspeople from Redondo Beach, California
21st-century American women